Zuleima (del Carmen) Amaya (born 1985) is a Venezuelan marathon runner. On April 24, 2016 she finished the 5th annual running of the race (out of 10,680 runners) in the 42.2k CAF-Caracas marathon. In 2018 she came in third place (for women) at a time of 1:23:59.

References

1985 births
Living people
Venezuelan female marathon runners
Venezuelan female long-distance runners
Venezuelan female cross country runners
Central American and Caribbean Games medalists in athletics
20th-century Venezuelan women
21st-century Venezuelan women